Alien Hunter is a 2003 American-Bulgarian science-fiction-thriller film directed by Ronald Krauss and starring James Spader, Carl Lewis and Leslie Stefanson.

Plot
In 1947 New Mexico, a radio operator receives a bizarre signal, coming from Roswell, New Mexico. He decides to investigate the signal's origin and goes out to follow it, never to be seen again.

Present day and the same signal is received from the South Pole and then retransmitted from the Falkland Islands to the United States. A satellite image captures an unknown object sitting on the Antarctic snow. Cryptologist Julian Rome (James Spader), a teacher at the University of California, Berkeley, is invited to investigate the mystery. He is sent to an Antarctic research base, which includes a huge greenhouse of genetically modified plants being studied by the scientists. They find what appears to be an alien vehicle frozen in a huge block of ice. The unknown object is shaped like a shell or pod and is emitting the mysterious encrypted signal. Once it is freed of the ice, Julian discovers that it has a powerful static electric charge on its surface and painfully shocks anyone who touches it.

Julian tries to decrypt the signal (which soon proves to be: "Do not open!"), while another team works to open the alien shell. They succeed in cutting off the lid, which allows a viscous alien liquid to pour out. An alien also escapes and at the same time an airborne virus sealed in the shell kills four members of the scientific team by melting them from within. The virus also kills all the plants, making them wilt and turn brown. The virus has an unusually high speed of transmission and extreme virulence. It kills anyone within a few minutes of exposure.

The government is aware of the alien virus and the global risk that it poses. They ask a Russian nuclear submarine to fire a nuclear missile at the base before the threat can spread. As the submarine nears its firing position, Julian manages to communicate with the alien, before it is unfortunately killed by one of the survivors. Julian realizes that if any of the survivors leave the base alive, the lethal alien virus will cause a pandemic destroying all life on earth. Just a few seconds before the missile hits, he and three others, Shelly, Kate, and Dr. Gierach, are rescued from the base by an alien spacecraft (which had homed in on the same signal Julian was studying).

In the aftermath, the government mounts a cover-up campaign by claiming that an experimental nuclear reactor at the base went into melt-down, destroying all of the facilities and killing everyone. The film ends with the alien spacecraft, still carrying the human survivors, leaving the solar system.

Cast
 James Spader as Julian Rome
 Janine Eser as Dr. Kate Brecher
 John Lynch as Dr. Michael Straub
 Nikolay Binev as Dr. Alexi Gierach
 Leslie Stefanson as Nyla Olson
 Aimee Graham as Shelly Klein
 Stuart Charno as Abell
 Carl Lewis as Grisham
 Svetla Vasileva as Dacia Petrov
 Anthony Crivello as Pilot
 Kaloian Vodenicharov as Co-Pilot
 George Stanchev as Airman
 Rufus Dorsey as Navigator
 Roy Dotrice as Dr. John Bachman
 Woody Schultz as Sam
 Ron Krauss as First Man
 William Ladd Skinner as Second Man
 Franklin A. Vallente as Third Man
 Hristo Aleksandrov as Fourth Man
 Ross W. Clarkson as Falkland Man # 1
 Willie Botha as Falkland Man # 2
 Tyrone Pinkham as Kitt Peak Man #1
 Atanas Srebrev as Kitt Peak Man #2
 Joel Polis as Copeland
 Keir Dullea as Secretary Bayer
 Bert Emmett as Gordon Osler
 Marianne Stanicheva as Reporter
 Dobrin Dosev as Captain Sokolov
 Atanas Atanasov as Executive Officer Volkov
 Hristo Shopov as Navigator Petrenko
 Harry Anichkin as Army General
 Velimir Velev as Alien

See also
 The Thing

References

External links 
 
 
 
  at Crackle

2003 films
2003 science fiction action films
American science fiction action films
Bulgarian action films
Bulgarian thriller films
English-language Bulgarian films
Alien visitations in films
Films about viral outbreaks
Films set in Antarctica
Films set in California
Films set in New Mexico
Nu Image films
Films shot in Bulgaria
Films set in 1947
American science fiction thriller films
Bulgarian science fiction films
2000s English-language films
Films produced by Boaz Davidson
Films with screenplays by Boaz Davidson
2000s American films